Lucas Agustín Cardozo (born 13 July 1998) is an Argentine professional footballer who plays as a forward.

Career
Cardozo joined All Boys' academy from Deportivo Merlo. Pablo Solchaga picked Cardozo for his professional bow on 25 February 2019 in Primera B Metropolitana, as the forward came off the substitutes bench in place of Lucas Nicchiarelli as the match with Justo José de Urquiza ended as a draw. A further sub appearance arrived against Colegiales, before he played as a starter for the first time in March versus Comunicaciones. Cardozo was released at the end of 2019. He subsequently joined Atenas of the Uruguayan Segunda División.

Career statistics
.

References

External links

1998 births
Living people
Sportspeople from Buenos Aires Province
Argentine footballers
Association football forwards
Argentine expatriate footballers
Expatriate footballers in Uruguay
Argentine expatriate sportspeople in Uruguay
Primera B Metropolitana players
All Boys footballers
Atenas de San Carlos players
Asociación Social y Deportiva Justo José de Urquiza players